The Texoma Council of Governments (TCOG) is a voluntary association of cities, counties and special districts in North Texas.

Based in Sherman, the Texoma Council of Governments is a member of the Texas Association of Regional Councils. It is also a part of the Texoma region.

Counties served
Cooke
Fannin
Grayson

Largest cities in the region
Sherman
Denison
Gainesville
Bonham

References

External links
Texoma Council of Governments - Official site.

Texas Association of Regional Councils